Gregory Dolin is an American lawyer and law professor who served as an associate justice of the Supreme Court of Palau, having been sworn into office on January 7, 2020. He resigned in January 2022 in order to return to his regular duties as a law professor in the University of Baltimore School of Law, where he remains on the faculty.

Dolin received a B.A. with honors from the Johns Hopkins University, followed by an M.A. from the George Washington University, an M.D. with Recognition in Humanities from the Stony Brook University, and a J.D. cum laude from the Georgetown University Law Center in 2004.

He previously served as a law clerk to Judge Pauline Newman of the United States Court of Appeals for the Federal Circuit, and to Judge Hiram Emory Widener Jr. of the United States Court of Appeals for the Fourth Circuit.

References

External links
Faculty profile of Gregory Dolin at the University of Baltimore School of Law
Profile of Gregory Dolin at the Cato Institute

Date of birth missing (living people)
Place of birth missing (living people)
Palauan judges
Johns Hopkins University alumni
George Washington University alumni
Stony Brook University alumni
Georgetown University Law Center alumni
Law clerks
University of Baltimore faculty
Year of birth missing (living people)
Living people